Aparicio Méndez Manfredini (24 August 1904 – 27 June 1988) was a Uruguayan lawyer and political. He was a de facto President  of Uruguay from 1976–1981 as a non-democratically elected authority of the civic-military dictatorship.

Background
Born in the northern city of Rivera, Méndez was a member of the National Party, traditionally strong in the interior of the country whence he originated. He built up a reputation as an expert in administrative law.

Méndez served as Health Minister from 1961 to 1964.

In addition to his political life, Méndez was a close personal friend of the Spanish classical guitarist Andrés Segovia.  Segovia lived in Montevideo during the 1940s, and came into contact with Méndez during this time.  Segovia composed two original pieces for Méndez, the Anecdote #4 (published in Guitar Review Magazine in 1947), and the Preludio #8 (subtitled "on a theme by Aparicio Méndez") which was published by Edizioni Musicali Bèrben in 1998.

President of Uruguay
Méndez was one of various civilian political figures who participated in the civilian-military administration which took office following President Juan Maria Bordaberry's coup in 1973 at a time of great social tension. It was as one who had built a reputation for reliability with its military participants that he subsequently served as President for five years.

Free constitutional referendum
In 1980, Méndez's government held a constitutional referendum, the free nature of which was underlined by the fact that the electorate rejected the government's proposals.

Death and legacy
Méndez died in Montevideo in 1988. Some would argue that, in agreeing to serve as President with military support, Aparicio Méndez was effectively repudiating the principles of the National Party with which he had been associated. Others would point out that Méndez was far from alone among the various civilian party political figures who participated in the Civic-military dictatorship (1973–1985), and that he presided over a free referendum.

References

See also
Politics of Uruguay

People from Rivera Department
Presidents of Uruguay
Ministers for Public Health of Uruguay
Uruguayan people of Italian descent
Uruguayan people of Spanish descent
1904 births
1988 deaths
University of the Republic (Uruguay) alumni
Academic staff of the University of the Republic (Uruguay)
National Party (Uruguay) politicians
Civic-military dictatorship of Uruguay
20th-century Uruguayan lawyers
Uruguayan anti-communists